The A4536 is a very short major road on the northern outskirts of Worcester, England. The road runs south from its junction with the A38 at the village of Fernhill Heath to join the A449  later.

References

Roads in Worcestershire
Transport in Worcester, England